Atongo Zimba (born 1967) is a musician and griot from Ghana. His tours in Europe, South America and Africa include a benefit for the 2010 Haiti earthquake, at the Alliance Française in Accra. His 1994 album Allah Mongode was recorded in Switzerland. His album Barefoot in the Sand was nominated "African CD of the Year" in 2007 by Amsterdam television.  His recording of "In Heaven There Is No Beer | No Beer in Heaven" was a major hit in Ghana in 2004.

Discography
 Allah Mongode  1994
 Savannah Breeze 2005
 Barefoot in the Sand (October 2007)
 'A to Z' Album

References

External links
 Contains a video of a live performance.
 "Atongo Zimba - No Beer in Heaven", YouTube.

1967 births
Living people
Ghanaian highlife musicians
20th-century Ghanaian male singers
21st-century Ghanaian male singers
21st-century Ghanaian singers